Derek Tate (born 6 September 1980) is an Australian cricketer. He played in one Twenty20 cricket match for Queensland in 2006.

See also
 List of Queensland first-class cricketers

References

External links
 

1980 births
Living people
Australian cricketers
Queensland cricketers
Cricketers from Brisbane